Dickerman may refer to:

Charles Heber Dickerman (1843–1915), Democratic member of the U.S. House of Representatives from Pennsylvania
Ernie Dickerman (1910–1998), American wilderness advocate and conservationist
Leah Dickerman, Director of Editorial & Content Strategy at The Museum of Modern Art (MoMA) in New York City
Leo Dickerman (1896–1982), pitcher in Major League Baseball
Marion Dickerman (1890–1983), American suffragist, educator, vice-principal of the Todhunter School, friend of Eleanor Roosevelt
Rob Dickerman, neurological and spine surgeon from Plano, Texas
Watson B. Dickerman (1846–1923), American banker, founded Dominick & Dickerman, president of the New York Stock Exchange
Willard Dickerman Straight (1880–1918), American investment banker, publisher, reporter, diplomat
C. Dickerman Williams (1900–1998), American lawyer known as a freedom of speech advocate

See also
Dominick & Dickerman, investment and merchant banking firm, located in New York City
Mount Dickerman, a mountain in Mount Baker-Snoqualmie National Forest in Washington state
Jerry E. Dickerman House, historic house at 36 Field Avenue in the city of Newport, Vermont
Jonathan Dickerman II House, historic house museum at 105 Mt. Carmel Avenue in Hamden, Connecticut
Dickerman Park, urban park in Saint Paul, Minnesota, United States
Dickman